Strategic autonomy is defined as the ability of a state to pursue its national interests and adopt its preferred foreign policy without depending heavily on  other foreign states.

In European context, strategic autonomy is the ability of the European Union to defend Europe and act militarily in its neighborhood without so much reliance on the United States.

European Union

Strategic autonomy is a policy objective of the European Union under the von der Leyen Commission.

A first reference to strategic autonomy in the discussions of the European council of ministers can be dated back to December 2013. The European Council called for the development of European defense capabilities to enhance the strategic autonomy of the European Union.

In 2016, strategic autonomy became part of the European Union Global Strategy doctrine to improve the defense capabilities of the European Union, including the setting up of a European Defence Fund established in 2017.
Strategic autonomy became central to the European Commission led by Ursula von der Leyen, who stated her intention to have a “geopolitical commission.” 
Members of the Von der Leyen Commission including Josep Borrell and Thierry Breton claim that Europe's soft power needs to be complemented by a harder power dimension.

Initially, the concept of the European strategic autonomy has been inspired and by France, which advocated for this strategy at the European Union's level.
Strategic autonomy has however developed into a broader concept that includes economic, energy and digital policy and initiatives such as GAIA-X. European Union Member States, such as Germany, display different preferences than France when it comes to the priorities of a strategic autonomy policy.
Strategic autonomy expanded to the digital policy of the European Union with an objective to ascertain European sovereignty against China.

Post-Trump era 
Strategic autonomy was a priority in European defense policy during the presidency of Donald Trump in the United States, seen as an unreliable partner by the European Union. The goal of strategic autonomy is however not to act alone militarily, and the European Union can be characterized as non-interventionist in nature.
The election of Joe Biden in the United States brought expectations of a Euro-Atlantic unity that has to be reconciled with the strategic autonomy of the European Union.
The election of Joe Biden has brought discord between France and Germany over the future of European defense and strategic autonomy.

The Biden administration has expressed criticism towards the strategic autonomy ambitions of the EU and the ability of the EU to develop its own credible military capabilities.

The 2022 Russian invasion of Ukraine has been perceived as an attack on the institutions of the EU and a test of the European strategic autonomy, defended by the French president Emmanuel Macron.

On December 2nd 2022, Finnish Prime Minister Sanna Marin said that Europe must strengthen its defences because they are currently “not strong enough” to stand up to Russia’s invasion of Ukraine alone, and have been relying on American support.

See also
 Trade and Technology Council
 European army
 GAIA-X
 Client state
 Satellite state
 European Defence Fund

References 

 Politics of the European Union 
 Foreign relations of the European Union 
 Military of the European Union
 Transatlantic relations
 United States–European Union relations

es:Autonomía estratégica